Holocarpha is a small genus of flowering plants in the family Asteraceae. The genus contains four species of tarweeds, which are all endemic to California.

Description
Holocarpha are glandular, aromatic annual herbs bearing yellow flowers.

Species
Holocarpha heermannii - Heermann's tarweed
Holocarpha macradenia - Santa Cruz tarweed
Holocarpha obconica - San Joaquin tarweed
Holocarpha virgata - yellowflower tarweed

Other "tarweeds"
Plants with the same common name, but in a different genus include:
 Santa Susana tarweed - Deinandra minthornii - (Asteraceae, endemic state-listed rare species in Simi Hills and nearby ranges)

References

External links
Jepson Manual Treatment: Holocarpha
United States Department of Agriculture Plants Profile: Holocarpha

Asteraceae genera
Endemic flora of California
Madieae
Flora without expected TNC conservation status